Orokenda was a town in ancient Pamphylia, inhabited during Roman times. Its name does not occur in ancient authors, but is inferred by epigraphic and other evidence.

Its site is located east of Sennea, in Asiatic Turkey.

References

Populated places in ancient Pamphylia
Former populated places in Turkey
Roman towns and cities in Turkey
History of Antalya Province
Greek colonies in Anatolia